Weimarer may refer to:

 Weimarer Ausgabe, the German name for the Weimar edition of Martin Luther's works
 Weimarer Land, a district in the east of Thuringia, Germany
 Weimarer Republik, the German name for the Weimar Republic, a parliamentary republic in Germany from 1919 to 1933